Armine Nutting Gosling (1861 – December 15, 1942) was a Canadian suffragette, best known for her involvement in the nascent Newfoundland women's rights movement.

Early life 
Born in Waterloo, Canada East, to Vespasian and Harriet Nutting, Armine Nutting came to St. John's, Newfoundland in January 1882 to take the role of principal at the Church of England Girls' School (Bishop Spencer College). While in Newfoundland, she met William Gilbert Gosling, a "fellow resident" of the boarding house she occupied in St. John's. A son of an elite white colonial family in Bermuda, William Gilbert Gosling worked his way up through the ranks of Harvey and Company, eventually becoming the director of the company in 1913. He and Armine were in married in 1888. Gosling is well known in St. John's for her community work; she worked for the Society for the Protection of Animals and the Child Welfare Association, and was the first female member of the Council of Higher Education in Newfoundland.

Women's rights movements and social activism 
Gosling is best remembered for her involvement in the Newfoundland women's rights movement, where she was founder and first Secretary of the Ladies Reading Room and Current Events Club (Old Colony Club). After World War I she became active in politics as president of the Women's Party, which ran two candidates in the 1925 St. John's municipal election.  Armine Gosling delivered her first address on the subject of women's suffrage in 1912, which was so well received that it was later published as a pamphlet. The 1925 election was the first election that allowed Newfoundland women to vote. Gosling's participation in the women's rights movement was gradual. As a child in Waterloo, her mother was the pillar of the household as her father suffered from alcoholism. Her mother, Harriet, was a seamstress and milliner who pushed her children to "get ahead" from their working class position. During the first portion of her married life, she led a conventional life as a homemaker and mother, raising four children past infancy. However, as her husband became more successful and they established a comfortable life for themselves, she began to address topics of women's rights and women's importance in Newfoundland society. Her first public address that touched on women's rights was given in 1894 at the Athenaeum Club on the topic of Charles Wesley's hymn "Jesus, Lover of my Soul." Armine Gosling took an active interest in many causes, helping to found the Society for the Protection of Animals in 1912, as well as being a keen and competent curler. Armine Gosling took a particular interest in the welfare of children, working with her husband to establish the Child Welfare Association and was the Secretary of the Church of England Orphanage.

Personal life 
Armine Gosling married Gilbert Gosling in 1888. They had six children, four of whom survived to adulthood.

Upon her husband's death in 1930, Gosling devoted much of the rest of her life to preserving and publishing his work. She presented his book collection to the city of St. John's. This collection subsequently formed the nucleus of the Gosling Memorial Library at the Memorial University of Newfoundland.

See also
 List of people of Newfoundland and Labrador

References

External links 
Biography at Memorial University of Newfoundland Library

1861 births
1942 deaths
People from St. John's, Newfoundland and Labrador
People from Montérégie
Canadian emigrants to pre-Confederation Newfoundland
Anglophone Quebec people